Khorramabad-e Laqu (also Romanized as  Khorramābād-e Laqū; also known as Khorramābād) is a village in Hakimabad Rural District, in the Central District of Zarandieh County, Markazi Province, Iran. At the 2006 census, its population was 54, in 12 families.

References 

Populated places in Zarandieh County